Pseudoxya diminuta is a species of grasshopper in the monotypic genus Pseudoxya (subfamily Oxyinae). 

This species occurs in Indochina, Malesia, and southern China. The holotype is a male from Yunnan, China.

Gallery

References

External links

Oxyinae
Acrididae genera
Orthoptera of Asia
Invertebrates of Vietnam